Josef Johanns (born 14 May 1944) is a Luxembourgian racing cyclist. He rode in the 1968 Tour de France.

References

1944 births
Living people
Luxembourgian male cyclists
Place of birth missing (living people)